The Cantabrians (Spanish: Los Cántabros) is a 1980 sword and sandal film about the Cantabrian Wars, starring and directed by Paul Naschy. The film describes the conflict between Cantabrian guerrilla leader Corocotta and Roman general Marcus Agrippa.

Cast
 Paul Naschy as Marcus Vipsanius Agrippa
 Daniel Barry as Corocotta 
 Verónica Miriel as Elia, Corocotta's sister
 Alfredo Mayo as Lábaro, a Druid
 Julia Saly as Selenia, a seer
 Blanca Estrada as Turenia, Corocotta's wife
 Andrés Resino as Augustus Caesar
 Antonio Iranzo as Sonanso, Cantabrian traitor
 Ricardo Palacios as Gurco, adopted Cantabrian warrior
 Pepe Ruiz as Hurón, adopted Cantabrian warrior
 Paloma Hurtado as Calpurnia
 Frank Braña as Próculo
 Mariano Vidal Molina as Salvio

Plot
A voice-over describes how the Cantabrian tribes led by Corocotta have repeatedly defeated the Roman attempts to annex their territory in Spain. In Rome, Augustus is furious. His general Agrippa proposes a new plan - to defeat the Canabrians by adopting their own guerrilla tactics. Meanwhile, in Spain, Corocotta attacks what he thinks is a Roman gold-transport, only to find rocks. He frees the slaves, who join his forces. Selenia, a seer, warns Corocotta of danger, but also tells Corocotta that his wife has given birth to a son. While Corocotta sees his wife and new child, Agrippa meets with Sonanso, a Cantabrian traitor who agrees to help him.

Aided by the traitor, Agrippa ambushes and defeats part of Corocotta's force. Selenia gives Corocotta a drug, and he dreams that to fight Agrippa is to fight Death himself. However, supported by the druid Lábaro, he refuses to give in. In the next battle Corocotta takes Agrippa's men by surprise, badly mauling the Romans. Agrippa is furious and discovers that his Cantabrian mistress has been informing Corocotta about Roman troop movements. Realising that the Canatbrian spirit of the resistance will not easily be broken, Agrippa decides to adopt more ruthless tactics, telling his men to take no prisoners, including the women and children. Corocotta is ambushed and badly wounded, but escapes. Lábaro and Selenia say that Agrippa must be stopped. Elia, Corocotta's sister, resolves to kill Agrippa using a sacred knife given her by Selenia. She sneaks into his tent and tries to stab him, but after a hard struggle with Agrippa, she is seriously wounded by an arrow shot by a guard. Agrippa is struck by her beauty and spirit. He nurses her back to health and falls in love with her. The two become lovers.

Agrippa gives Elia a letter to take to Corocotta offering peace terms. Sonasso denounces her as a traitor, whipping up a crowd to stone her. Corocotta intervenes and kills Sonasso. Agrippa discusses the situation with Augustus, who agrees to offer a large reward for the capture of Corocotta. Corocotta himself then appears before Augustus, offering himself in exchange for the freedom of his people. Augustus is impressed by his bravery and lets him go. Selenia tells Agrippa that he must resolve things in a personal combat between himself and Corocotta. In the fight, Corocotta defeats Agrippa, who agrees to leave his people alone, for the moment. Corocotta leaves with his family and followers, taking the reward.

Production and reception
Naschy took this project over from Spanish horror film director Amando de Ossorio, who had originally been hired to direct it; Naschy totally rewrote the screenplay and recast the film. Appearing under his own name as lead actor, he used the pseudonym "Jacinto Molina" as director and screenwriter. The film "failed miserably at the box office".

Notes

1980 films
Peplum films
Spanish action adventure films
Spanish historical adventure films
1980s historical films
1980s Spanish-language films
Films directed by Paul Naschy
Films set in the 1st century BC
Sword and sandal
Sword and sandal films
Depictions of Augustus on film
1980s Italian films